Panasonic is a Japanese multinational electronics corporation.

Panasonic may also refer to:

 Panasonic (brand), a brand name of Panasonic
 Panasonic (cycling team), a Dutch road-racing team 1984–1992
 Panasonic (band), an electronic music group from Finland
 Panasonic (film), a 2008 American surreal dramatic fantasy film